Currency Creek may refer to the following located in South Australia:
Currency Creek (South Australia), a river 
 Currency Creek, South Australia, a locality
 Currency Creek Arboretum
Currency Creek wine region
Currency Creek Game Reserve